Stanislav Viktorovich Reznikov (born 8 April 1986) is a Russian former professional footballer.

Club career
He made his debut in the Russian Premier League in 2003 for FC Chernomorets Novorossiysk.

On 7 June 2019, Russian Football Union banned him from football activity for three years after he allegedly accepted a bribe for ensuring that his team FC Chernomorets Novorossiysk loses to FC Chayka Peschanokopskoye.

References

1986 births
People from Novorossiysk
Living people
Russian footballers
Russia youth international footballers
Association football defenders
Association football midfielders
FC Chernomorets Novorossiysk players
FC Luch Vladivostok players
FC Shinnik Yaroslavl players
Russian Premier League players
FC Baltika Kaliningrad players
FC Sakhalin Yuzhno-Sakhalinsk players
FC Saturn Ramenskoye players
FC Nosta Novotroitsk players
Sportspeople from Krasnodar Krai